Magik may refer to:


Comics 
 Magik (Amanda Sefton), an alias used by Marvel Comics character Amanda Sefton
 Magik (comics), a four-issue comic book limited series published by Marvel Comics in 1983–84
 Magik (Illyana Rasputina), an alias used by Marvel Comics X-Men character Illyana Rasputin

Music 
 Magik, fictional band in the film Rock On!!
 Magik One: First Flight, the first in a series of seven albums by DJ Tiësto
 Magik (rapper) (1978–2000), Polish rapper
 Magik (series), a trance mix-compilation series by Tiësto

Other uses 
 Magik (film), an upcoming animated film with Benedict Cumberbatch
 Magik (programming language), an object-oriented language

See also 
 Magic (disambiguation)